Sheykhian or Sheykhiyan or Sheykheyan may refer to:
 Sheykhian Mari
 Sheykhian-e Shahab
 Sheykhian Solonji
 Bagh Pir, Bushehr (Sheykhian Bagh Pir)